is a volcanic, deserted island located in the Philippine Sea approximately  south of Tokyo in between Toshima and Nii-jima, in the northern portion of the Izu archipelago, Japan.

Geography
The island is the remnant of an andesite lava dome with sheer sides, the only visible portion of a submarine volcanic caldera. The main island is surrounded by a number of rocks.

Despite its small size, the island was formerly inhabited during the Meiji period by a small community of fishermen who also engaged in sericulture. A small Shinto shrine still exists on the island.

Natural History

This island shares many similarities in its biodiversity in common with neighboring islands such as Nii-jima. Being surrounded by rough sea, vicinity to the island is rather difficult to visit in fact, and this made the natural environments of the islands and nearby atolls protected. Indo-Pacific bottlenose dolphins that newly inhabited around Udone-shima as their residential range has been expanded wider even onto Honshu coasts. Larger sharks inhabit the area. Historically, a breeding colony of now-extinct Japanese sea lions once existed on the island as well.

See also

 Izu Islands
 Desert island
 List of islands

External links

Quaternary Volcanoes in Japan

Izu Islands
Uninhabited islands of Japan
Former populated places in Japan
Extinct volcanoes
Islands of Tokyo